The 1952 Clemson Tigers football team was an American football team that represented Clemson College in the Southern Conference during the 1952 college football season. In its 13th season under head coach Frank Howard, the team compiled a 2–6–1 record and was outscored by a total of 157 to 112. The team played its home games at Memorial Stadium in Clemson, South Carolina.

When Clemson and Maryland defied the Southern Conference's ban on postseason games by participating in bowl games after the 1951 season, the conference placed both schools on probation for one year and imposed a football scheduling boycott against them.  Accordingly, Clemson was able to play games against only two conference opponents in 1952: Maryland (also on probation) and South Carolina (the annual "Big Thursday" rivalry game was set by the South Carolina Legislature and was therefore exempted from the boycott).

George Rodgers was the captain of the 1952 Clemson team. The team's statistical leaders included tailback Don King with 317 passing yards and fullback Red Whitten with 445 rushing yards. Four players tied for the scoring leadership with 18 points each: Don King, Red Whitten, tailback Billy Hair, and wingback Buck George.

Three Clemson players were named to the All-South Carolina football team for 1952: Billy Hair, tackle Earl Wrightenberry, and guard Tom Barton.

Clemson did not return to the Southern Conference, opting in June 1953 to leave the conference along with Duke Maryland, North Carolina, NC State, South Carolina, and Wake Forest in forming the Atlantic Coast Conference (ACC).

Schedule

References

Clemson
Clemson Tigers football seasons
Clemson Tigers football